Martin Rolinek (born 30 June 2000) is a Czech football player, who currently plays for SK Líšeň as a midfielder.

External links
 Profile at MSFL.cz
 

2000 births
Living people
Czech footballers
FC Zbrojovka Brno players
SK Líšeň players
Association football midfielders
Czech National Football League players
Footballers from Brno